Of Time, Tombs and Treasures is a 1977 American short documentary film about the discovery the Tomb of the Tutankamun. Produced by James R. Messenger, the film was nominated for an Academy Award for Best Documentary Short.

References

External links

1977 films
1977 documentary films
1977 short films
Documentary films about Egypt
1970s short documentary films
American short documentary films
Documentary films about historical events
Valley of the Kings
Films shot in Egypt
Films about archaeology
Tutankhamun
1970s English-language films
1970s American films